is a Japanese global glass manufacturing company. The company is headquartered in Sagamihara with subsidiaries in a number of countries, including Japan, the United States, Germany, Hong Kong, Malaysia, Taiwan, and China, with Ohara Corporation being the U.S. subsidiary of the Ohara Group. Ohara manufactures glasses since 1935, the year of its founding.

Their web site lists areas of specialization, including:
 Optical Glass
 Polished Substates
 Fused Silica and Quartz
 IR Materials and Optical Crystals
 Low Expansion Glass
 Glass Ceramics
 Measurement Services

Optical glass

Among other things, Ohara is a major supplier of optical glass. Lens design programs will typically include glasses in the Ohara catalog among their stock material choices, along with, for example, glasses in the Schott catalog. On their website, Ohara describes a line of more than 130 environmentally safe glasses, produced without lead and arsenic.

They produce more than 300 tons of optical glass a month (against 10800 tons/month for Schott and over 108000 tons/month for Corning). The glass is available in a variety of forms, including strip, slab, cut blanks, and pressings.

Ohara includes in its catalog the famous E6 borosilicate (similar to Corning's Pyrex), ClearCeram-Z (a vitroceramic similar to Schott's Zerodur), and two well-known low dispersion glasses: FPL51 (the UD glass used by Canon) and FPL53 showing properties close to fluorite.

Telescope mirror glass
Ohara supplied over 23.5 tons of their E6 borosilicate glass, the purest optical glass in the world, to be cast into the blank of the primary and tertiary mirror of the Large Synoptic Survey Telescope.

E6 glass was also used to manufacture the mirror of the Giant Magellan Telescope and the Large Binocular Telescope, both having a primary mirror 8.4 m wide.

References

External links

 Ohara Group 

Glassmaking companies of Japan
Defense companies of Japan
Companies listed on the Tokyo Stock Exchange
Companies based in Kanagawa Prefecture
Manufacturing companies established in 1935
Glass trademarks and brands
Multinational companies headquartered in Japan
Japanese brands
Japanese companies established in 1935